HHMI Tangled Bank Studios is a film studio founded in 2012 by the Howard Hughes Medical Institute.

The studio works with filmmakers to create films about science for broadcast, theatrical and digital distribution. The studio's films focus primarily on the life sciences, and are centered around four main themes: Pioneers of Science, Frontiers in Medicine, The Health of Our Planet and Countering Denialism (films that present scientific evidence on topics such as evolution and vaccination).

Filmography

References

External links 

 

American film studios
Companies based in Chevy Chase, Maryland
American companies established in 2012